The 1990 season of the African Cup Winners' Cup football club tournament was won by BCC Lions in two-legged final victory against Club Africain. This was the sixteenth season that the tournament took place for the winners of each African country's domestic cup. Thirty-six sides entered the competition, with Al Suguar withdrawing before the 1st leg of the first round.

Preliminary round

|}

First round

|}

Second round

|}

Quarter-finals

|}

Semi-finals

|}

Final

|}

First leg

Second leg

External links
 Results available on CAF Official Website
 Results available on RSSSF

African Cup Winners' Cup
2